Prof Michael Adrian Stroud, OBE, FRCP (born 17 April 1955) is an expert on human health under extreme conditions.  He became widely known when he partnered with Ranulph Fiennes on polar expeditions.

Early life
Stroud was educated at Trinity School of John Whitgift in the London Borough of Croydon. He obtained a degree (intercalated BSc) from University College London in anthropology and genetics in 1976, before qualifying as a medical doctor from St George's Hospital Medical School, London in 1979.

Medical career
After qualifying, and working junior hospital jobs, Stroud specialised in nutrition and gastroenterology. He became a Member of the Royal College of Physicians in 1984 and a Fellow in 1995. He has studied human endurance under extreme conditions based on personal experience including running marathons in the Sahara and trekking across polar ice.  He has worked for the Ministry of Defence researching the nutritional needs of soldiers in action and the effects of heat and cold on human performance.  In 1998 he became a Senior Lecturer in Nutrition and Medicine and a Consultant Gastroenterologist at the Southampton University Hospitals NHS Trust and in 2017 he was given a personal Professorial chair in Clinical Nutrition. He has taken time out from his medical career over the years to participate in various expeditions.

Expeditions and endurance
Stroud was the doctor on the  In the footsteps of Scott Antarctic expedition in 1984-1986. He joined Ranulph Fiennes in 1986 to attempt to journey on foot to the North Pole unsupported. In 1992/3 Stroud and Fiennes made the first unsupported crossing of the Antarctic continent, although they were unable to cross the Ross Ice Shelf to reach the open sea. Drinking isotope labelled water and collecting regular blood and urine samples, Stroud discovered that their energy expenditure exceeded 10,000 calories per day </ref>

Stroud, together with Fiennes, is a supporter of rigorous exercise to help slow down the aging process. He points out that historically the human body is pre-tuned to undergo bouts of hard work and in particular can cope remarkably well with endurance events in hot climates. He argues that our current sedentary lifestyle conflicts with our body's design and is leading to the health issues that an increasing proportion of the Western world is experiencing today.

In 2003 Stroud and Fiennes both completed seven marathons on seven continents in seven days in the  Land Rover 7x7x7 Challenge for the British Heart Foundation.

On Tuesday 22 July 2014 Stroud joined four others (Chris Buckton, Barry Robson, Mark Harding and Ian Smith) in kayaking 77.3 miles across the English Channel on sit-on-top kayaks helping to raise money and awareness for Macmillan Cancer Support and Heroes on the Water UK. This took 19 hours 21 minutes during which he never left the kayak. It is believed that this is the first time this has been done before in this direction as paddling South is notoriously difficult.

Other work
Stroud was the on-screen expert on endurance performance for all 3 of the BBC TV series SAS: Are You Tough Enough? and then presented his own BBC series The Challenge. He also featured as the main participant in one of the BBC programmes Through the Keyhole hosted by Sir David Frost.

Personal life
Stroud married Thea de Moel in 1987; Thea died in September 2018. They have a son and a daughter.

Honours
Stroud was appointed Officer of the Order of the British Empire in the 1993 Queen's Birthday Honours "for Human Endeavour and for charitable services". On 20 December 1994, he was awarded the Polar Medal "for outstanding achievement and service to British Polar exploration and research".

In 1995, he was elected a Fellow of the Royal College of Physicians.

Bibliography

References

Officers of the Order of the British Empire
1955 births
21st-century English medical doctors
British explorers
Explorers of Antarctica
Living people
Alumni of University College London
Fellows of the Royal College of Physicians
Recipients of the Polar Medal